This is a list of species in the genus Platylomalus.

Platylomalus species

 Platylomalus acisternus (Desbordes, 1914)
 Platylomalus aequalis (Say, 1825)
 Platylomalus alluaudi (Schmidt, 1893)
 Platylomalus arrowi Gomy, 1983
 Platylomalus bavicola Cooman, 1948
 Platylomalus biarculus (Marseul, 1870)
 Platylomalus bicavatus Cooman, 1955
 Platylomalus biellipticus Vienna, 1983
 Platylomalus calcuttanus Ôhara, 1989
 Platylomalus carinipygus Cooman, 1955
 Platylomalus ceylanicus (Motschulsky, 1863)
 Platylomalus cincticauda (Cooman, 1937)
 Platylomalus clavis (Marseul, 1879)
 Platylomalus complanatus (Panzer, 1797)
 Platylomalus cribratus (Lea, 1925)
 Platylomalus derasus (Schmidt, 1897)
 Platylomalus digitatus (Wollaston, 1867)
 Platylomalus erythraeus (G. Müller, 1938)
 Platylomalus evanescens (Marseul, 1879)
 Platylomalus exiguus (Fahraeus in Boheman, 1851)
 Platylomalus feae (Lewis, 1888)
 Platylomalus forestieri (Marseul, 1870)
 Platylomalus fossisternus (Cooman, 1936)
 Platylomalus fujisanus (Lewis, 1892)
 Platylomalus gardineri (Scott, 1913)
 Platylomalus goliath (Lewis, 1891)
 Platylomalus horni (Cooman, 1935)
 Platylomalus indicus (Lewis, 1892)
 Platylomalus inflexus Zhang and Zhou, 2007
 Platylomalus instabilis Vienna, 1983
 Platylomalus kabakovi Kryzhanovskij in Kryzhanovskij and Reichardt, 1976
 Platylomalus kusuii Ôhara, 1994
 Platylomalus lenticula (Schmidt, 1893)
 Platylomalus longicornis (Lewis, 1905)
 Platylomalus mendicus (Lewis, 1892)
 Platylomalus modiglianii (Schmidt, 1897)
 Platylomalus musicus (Marseul, 1864)
 Platylomalus niponensis (Lewis, 1899)
 Platylomalus nudipectus (Cooman, 1937)
 Platylomalus oceanitis (Marseul, 1855)
 Platylomalus osellai Vienna, 1983
 Platylomalus parvopunctatus (Lea, 1925)
 Platylomalus persimilis (Lewis, 1888)
 Platylomalus pseudosuturalis (Cooman, 1937)
 Platylomalus saucius (Blackburn, 1903)
 Platylomalus sauteri (Bickhardt, 1912)
 Platylomalus schultheissi (Schmidt, 1897)
 Platylomalus sinuaticeps (Cooman, 1937)
 Platylomalus submetallicus (Lewis, 1892)
 Platylomalus tcibodae (Marseul, 1879)
 Platylomalus terraereginae (Blackburn, 1903)
 Platylomalus therondi Vienna, 1983
 Platylomalus tonkinensis (Cooman, 1937)
 Platylomalus umbilicatus (Marseul, 1870)
 Platylomalus varionotus Vienna, 1983
 Platylomalus venator (Cooman, 1941)
 Platylomalus viaticus (Lewis, 1892)
 Platylomalus victoriae (Marseul, 1870)
 Platylomalus vittula (Marseul, 1879)
 Platylomalus zypi (Cooman, 1937)

References